Marco Antonio Etcheverry Vargas (born 26 September 1970) is a Bolivian retired professional footballer who played as a forward. A creative playmaker, he is considered one of the greatest Bolivian players of all time. Etcheverry played for D.C. United of Major League Soccer from 1996 to 2003. He helped D.C United win eight trophies during that time, and was nominated to the MLS Best XI in four consecutive seasons from 1996 to 1999.

Club career
Etcheverry, is nicknamed El Diablo (The Devil).

Etcheverry was trained at Bolivia's Tahuichi Academy, after which he played professionally with Bolivian sides (Destroyers, Bolívar, Oriente Petrolero), Spain (Albacete), Chile (Colo-Colo), Colombia (América de Cali) and Ecuador (Barcelona, Emelec).

Etchverry joined D.C. United of Major League Soccer in its inaugural season of 1996, and led the team to three MLS Cups and was named MLS MVP in 1998. In eight years with the team, Etcheverry played 191 league games, scoring 34 goals and registering 101 assists (the games and assists were DC records). He retired at the end of the 2003 season.

DC United honors
In 2005, he was named to the MLS All-Time Best XI.

On 23 September 2006, Etcheverry was honored at a home game against the New York Red Bulls. During halftime he was put up on the "D.C. United Tradition of Excellence" sign in the stadium. After all of this Etcheverry walked over to the La Barra Brava part of the stadium and did his trademark clap in front of them, he did after every game, win or lose.

On 20 October 2007, Etcheverry was honored with a tribute match at RFK Stadium, prior to United's regular-season finale versus Columbus. Etcheverry is the first United player to be so honored. Etcheverry, playing with teammates from the club's 1997 MLS Cup winning side, defeated Hollywood United (a collection of former players and actors), 2–1, with Etcheverry drawing and scoring the winning penalty in the final minute.

International career
Etcheverry compiled 71 caps and scored 13 goals for the Bolivia national team between 1989 and 2003. He scored four times during qualification for the 1994 FIFA World Cup, including an 88th minute opening goal in a 2–0 defeat of Brazil in La Paz - the first ever loss by the Seleção in World Cup qualifying, to help Bolivia participate in its first FIFA World Cup since 1950. At the tournament finals, El Diablo was sent off for kicking Lothar Matthäus four minutes after appearing as a substitute in the tournament's opening game against Germany. The subsequent suspension meant that Etcheverry played no further part in Bolivia's tournament, as La Verde finished bottom of Group C with two losses and a draw to South Korea.

Etcheverry scored twice in the 1997 Copa América as Bolivia reached the final to achieve its best performance in the competition since winning in 1963. He went on to represent the team in the subsequent FIFA Confederations Cup in 1999.

On 12 April 2006, the Bolivian Congress awarded him with the "Order of Merit" and a title of "Distinguished Citizen", for his sport achievements, shortly after his retirement.

International goals
Scores and results list Bolvia's goal tally first, score column indicates score after each Etcheverry goal.

Coaching career
Etcheverry made his debut as football coach in early 2008 after he accepted an offer from second division club Sociedad Deportiva Aucas, but he was sacked after only four months in charge. On 6 October 2009, Etcheverry was announced as the new Oriente Petrolero coach, replacing Pablo Sánchez. But in the middle of the negotiations he decided not to go through.

Honors
D.C. United
 MLS Cup: 1996, 1997, 1999
 MLS Supporters' Shield: 1997, 1999
 CONCACAF Champions League: 1998
 Copa Interamericana: 1998
 U.S. Open Cup: 1996

Barcelona S.C.
 Ecuadorian League Championship: 1997

Oriente Petrolero
 Bolivian League Championship: 2001

Individual
 MLS Best XI: 1996, 1997, 1998, 1999
 MLS Goal of the Year: 1997, 1999
 MLS Most Valuable Player: 1998
 MLS All-Star Game MVP: 2002
 MLS All-Time Best XI

References

External links
International statistics at rsssf

1970 births
Living people
Bolivian people of Spanish descent
Bolivian people of Basque descent
Sportspeople from Santa Cruz de la Sierra
Association football midfielders
Bolivian expatriate sportspeople in the United States
Bolivian footballers
Bolivia international footballers
Bolivia youth international footballers
1994 FIFA World Cup players
1999 FIFA Confederations Cup players
1989 Copa América players
1991 Copa América players
1993 Copa América players
1995 Copa América players
1997 Copa América players
1999 Copa América players
Club Destroyers players
Club Bolívar players
Albacete Balompié players
Colo-Colo footballers
América de Cali footballers
D.C. United players
Barcelona S.C. footballers
C.S. Emelec footballers
Oriente Petrolero players
La Liga players
Chilean Primera División players
Bolivian expatriate footballers
Bolivian expatriate sportspeople in Chile
Bolivian expatriate sportspeople in Colombia
Bolivian expatriate sportspeople in Ecuador
Bolivian expatriate sportspeople in Spain
Expatriate footballers in Spain
Expatriate footballers in Chile
Expatriate footballers in Colombia
Expatriate footballers in Ecuador
Major League Soccer players
Major League Soccer All-Stars
Bolivian football managers
Bolivian expatriate football managers
S.D. Aucas managers
Oriente Petrolero managers
National Soccer Hall of Fame members